Ankaraobato is a rural municipality in Madagascar. It belongs to the district of Marovoay, which is a part of Boeny Region. The population of the commune was 10,723 in 2019.

Only primary schooling is available. The majority 60% of the population of the commune are farmers, while an additional 29% receives their livelihood from raising livestock. The most important crop is rice, while other important products are bananas and maize.  Services provide employment for 1% of the population. Additionally fishing employs 10% of the population.

Twelve villages (fokontany) belong to this municipality:
01 – ANKARAOBATO - 00 km distance to the seat of the municipality
02 – BEANAMAMY/MALAO - 15 km
03 – SOAGOAGO - 12 km
04 – TSIANALOKA - 02 km
05 – ANTAMBARA/BEHANITRA - 02 km
06 – MORAFENO - 01 km
07 – MAVOZAZA - 18 km
08 – BEMAHOGO - 22 km
09 – ANDROTRA - 25 km
10 – BETSIKIRY - 45 km
11 – BEKORATSAKA - 40 km
12 – AMBATOFALIA - 62 km

References 

Populated places in Boeny